Bay Shore is an unincorporated community and census-designated place (CDP) located on the boundary between Charlevoix County and Emmet County in the U.S. state of Michigan. The population of the CDP was 657 at the 2020 census.  

Bay Shore is located along Little Traverse Bay on Lake Michigan just west of the city of Petoskey.  It is mostly within Hayes Township in Charlevoix County with a small portion extending east into Resort Township in Emmet County.

History
The land was originally owned by Eugene Sly and Nancy Stauffer.  The community was known as both Bay Side to the north and Bay Shore, but the Bay Shore name was adopted when the Chicago and West Michigan Railway built a station there in 1892.  The name Bay Shore came from its coastal location on Little Traverse Bay.  A post office opened in Bay Shore on July 25, 1892 with Sly serving as the first postmaster.  The community was surveyed and platted by John Swift in 1896.  The post office operated until September 30, 1965.   

While the community no longer has its own post office, it may use the Bay Shore 49711 post office box ZIP Code.   

The community of Bay Shore was listed as a newly-organized census-designated place for the 2010 census, meaning it now has officially defined boundaries and population statistics for the first time.

Geography

Major highways
  runs through the center of the community near the coast of Lake Michigan.
  is just to the east of the community and runs south to Horton Bay.

Demographics

Education
Bay Shore is located at the fringes of three separate school districts.  The Public Schools of Petoskey to the east in Petoskey serves the eastern portion of the community, including areas in both Charlevoix and Emmet counties.  The southernmost portion of the community may be served by Boyne City Public Schools at the northernmost edge of the school district centered far to the south in Boyne City.  The western portion of the community may attend Charlevoix Public Schools to the southwest in Charlevoix.

References

Unincorporated communities in Charlevoix County, Michigan
Unincorporated communities in Emmet County, Michigan
Unincorporated communities in Michigan
Census-designated places in Charlevoix County, Michigan
Census-designated places in Emmet County, Michigan
Census-designated places in Michigan
Populated places established in 1892
1892 establishments in Michigan
Michigan populated places on Lake Michigan